Günter Schmid (13 August 1932 – 29 May 2005) was the founder and principal of the Formula One teams ATS and Rial Racing.

References

1932 births
2005 deaths
German motorsport people
Formula One team owners
Formula One team principals